The 1953–54 FA Cup  was the 73rd staging of the world's oldest football cup competition, the Football Association Challenge Cup, commonly known as the FA Cup. West Bromwich Albion won the competition for the fourth time, beating Preston North End 3–2 in the final at Wembley.

Matches were scheduled to be played at the stadium of the team named first on the date specified for each round, which was always a Saturday. Some matches, however, might be rescheduled for other days if there were clashes with games for other competitions or the weather was inclement. If scores were level after 90 minutes had been played, a replay would take place at the stadium of the second-named team later the same week. If the replayed match was drawn further replays would be held until a winner was determined. If scores were level after 90 minutes had been played in a replay, a 30-minute period of extra time would be played.

Calendar

First round proper

At this stage clubs from the Football League Third Division North and South joined those non-league clubs having come through the qualifying rounds (except Harwich & Parkeston and Walthamstow Avenue that given byes to this round). Matches were scheduled to be played on Saturday, 21 November 1953. Seven were drawn and went to replays.

Second round proper
The matches were scheduled for Saturday, 12 December 1953. Eight matches were drawn, with replays taking place later the same week. The Wrexham–Brighton & Hove Albion match went to a second replay, which finished in Wrexham's favour.

Third round proper
The 44 First and Second Division clubs entered the competition at this stage. The matches were scheduled for Saturday, 9 January 1954. Fifteen matches were drawn and went to replays, with three of these requiring a second replay. The Blackpool–Luton Town match then went to a third replay, which was won by Blackpool.

Fourth round proper
The matches were scheduled for Saturday, 30 January 1954, with two matches taking place on later dates. Six matches were drawn and went to replays, which were all played in the following midweek match. The Scunthorpe United–Portsmouth match went to a second replay.

Fifth round proper
The matches were scheduled for Saturday, 20 February 1954. Two matches went to replays in the following mid-week fixture.

Sixth round proper
The four quarter-final ties were scheduled to be played on Saturday, 13 March 1954. Two matches went to replays, with the Leicester City–Preston North End match going to a second replay.

Semifinals
The semi-final matches were played on Saturday, 27 March 1954. Preston North End and West Bromwich Albion won their ties to meet in the final at Wembley.

Final

The 1954 FA Cup final was contested by West Bromwich Albion and Preston North End at Wembley. West Brom won 3–2, with goals from Ronnie Allen (2) and Frank Griffin. Angus Morrison and Charlie Wayman scored for Preston.

Match details

References
General
The FA Cup Archive at TheFA.com
F.A. Cup results 1953/54 at Footballsite
Specific

 
FA Cup seasons